Karrie K. Delaney (born December 5, 1978) is a Democratic member of the Virginia House of Delegates. She was first elected in 2017, and represents the 67th district in the Fairfax and Loudoun County suburbs of Washington, D.C. Before her election as state delegate Delaney served on numerous boards and commissions in Virginia. She served on the West Melbourne, Florida city council before moving to Northern Virginia.

Political career
In 2017, Delaney ran for the Virginia House of Delegates for the 67th district, then held by Republican incumbent James LeMunyon. Delaney won the June 2017 Democratic primary with 65% of the vote, defeating two other candidates. In the general election, Delaney defeated LeMunyon by a 58-42 margin.

Electoral history

References

External links
Karrie Delaney at the Virginia Public Access Project

1978 births
Living people
People from Chantilly, Virginia
People from West Melbourne, Florida
Florida city council members
Democratic Party members of the Virginia House of Delegates
Women city councillors in Florida
Women state legislators in Virginia
21st-century American politicians
21st-century American women politicians